El Tapihue Airport (is an airstrip  east of Casablanca, a city in the Valparaíso Region of Chile.

See also

Transport in Chile
List of airports in Chile

References

External links
OpenStreetMap - El Tapihue
OurAirports - El Tapihue
SkyVector - El Tapihue
FallingRain - El Tapihue Airport

Airports in Valparaíso Region